Manfred was the elected bishop of Pécs in 1306, but he died before his consecration. He was born before 1256. When the first record was made of him in 1277, Manfred was a canon at the cathedral chapter in Zagreb and dean of Gercse. He was promoted to the provostship of the cathedral chapter in 1292 at the latest. In his more than 29-year-long service in the Zagreb cathedral chapter, an important "place of authentication" in the Kingdom of Hungary, Manfred often witnessed the determination of borders between neighboring properties or acted as mediator between noblemen in Slavonia. The members of the cathedral chapter of Pécs elected Manfred bishop on 23 February 1306, but he died in some months.

References

  Koszta, László (2009). Manfréd választott püspök (1306). In: A Pécsi Egyházmegye története I: A középkor évszázadai (1009–1543) (Szerkesztette: Fedeles Tamás, Sarbak Gábor, Sümegi József), p. 89. ("A History of the Diocese of Pécs, Volume I: Medieval Centuries, 1009–1543; Edited by Tamás Fedeles, Gábor Sarbak and József Sümegi"); Fény Kft.; Pécs; .

1306 deaths
13th-century Hungarian people
14th-century Hungarian people
14th-century Roman Catholic bishops in Hungary
Bishops of Pécs
Year of birth unknown